Elyon ( ʿElyōn) is an epithet of the God of the Israelites in the Hebrew Bible.  is usually rendered in English as "God Most High", and similarly in the Septuagint as  ("God the highest").

The term also has mundane uses, such as "upper" (where the ending in both roots is a locative, not superlative or comparative), "top", or "uppermost", referring simply to the position of objects (e.g.  applied to a basket in Genesis 40.17 or to a chamber in Ezekiel 42.5).
This is also spelled as 'Elliyoun'

Hebrew Bible

The compound ʼĒl ʻElyōn
The compound name ʼĒl ʻElyōn 'God Most High' occurs in Genesis 14:18–20 as the God whose priest was Melchizedek, king of Salem. The form appears again almost immediately in verse 22, used by Abraham in an oath to the king of Sodom. In this verse the name of God also occurs in apposition to ʼĒl ʻElyōn in the Masoretic Text but is absent in the Samaritan version, in the Septuagint translation, and in Symmachus.

Its occurrence here was one foundation of a theory first espoused by Julius Wellhausen that ʼĒl ʻElyōn was an ancient god of Salem (for other reasons understood here to mean Jerusalem), later equated with God.

The only other occurrence of the compound expression is in : "And they remembered that God [ʼĒlōhīm] was their rock, and the high God [ʼĒl ʻElyōn] their redeemer."

The name is repeated later in the chapter, but with a variation: verse fifty-six says ʼElohim ʻElyōn.

It has been suggested that the reference to ʼĒl ʻElyōn, maker of heaven and earth" in Genesis 14:19 and 22 reflects a Canaanite background. The phrasing in Genesis resembles a retelling of Canaanite religious traditions in Philo of Byblos's account of Phoenician history, in which ʻElyōn was the progenitor of Ouranos ("Sky") and Gaia ("Earth"). Genesis 14:18–20

ʽElyōn standing alone
The name ʽElyōn 'Most High' standing alone is found in many poetic passages, especially in the Psalms.

It appears in Balaam's verse oracle in Numbers 24:16 as a separate name parallel to Ēl.

It appears in Moses' final song in Deuteronomy 32:8 (a much discussed verse). A translation of the Masoretic text:

Many Septuagint manuscripts have in place of "sons of Israel", angelōn theou 'angels of God' and a few have huiōn theou 'sons of God'. The Dead Sea Scrolls fragment 4QDeutj reads bny ’lwhm 'sons of God' ('sons of ’Elohim'). The New Revised Standard Version translates this as "he fixed the boundaries ... according to the number of the gods".

This passage appears to identify ʽElyōn with ’Elohim, but not necessarily with Yahweh. It can be read to mean that ʽElyōn separated mankind into 70 nations according to his 70 sons (the 70 sons of Ēl being mentioned in the Ugaritic texts), each of these sons to be the tutelary deity over one of the 70 nations, one of them being the God of Israel, Yahweh. Alternatively, it may mean that ʽElyōn, having given the other nations to his sons, now takes Israel for himself under the name of the Tetragrammaton. Both interpretations have supporters.

In Isaiah 14:13–14 ʽElyōn is used in a very mystical context in the passage providing the basis for later speculation on the fall of Satan where the rebellious prince of Babylon is pictured as boasting:

But ’Elyōn is in other places firmly identified with Yahweh, as in 2 Samuel 22:14:

Also Psalm 97:9: "For you, Lord [YHWH], are Most High [ʽelyōn] over all the earth; you are raised high over all the gods."

Non-biblical use

Sfire I Treaty

Outside of the Biblical texts the term "Most High" occurs seldom.

The "Sefire I" inscription (KAI. 222.I.A.8–12; ANET p. 659), which dates to about 750 BCE, lists the major patron deities of each side, all of them in pairs coupled by "and", in each case a male god and the god's spouse when the names are known. Then, after a gap comes ’l wʽlyn
 This possibly means "’Ēl and ʽElyōn", seemingly also two separate gods, followed by further pairs of deities.
 It is possible also that these indicate two aspects of the same god.
 It might be a single divine name. The Ugaritic texts contain divine names like Kothar waḪasis "Skillful-and-Clever", Mot waShar "Death-and-Prince" (or possibly "Death-and-Destruction'), Nikkal-and-Ib, which is in origin the name of the Sumerian goddess Ningal combined with an element of unknown meaning. Therefore, Ēl waʽElyōn might be a single name 'God-and-Highest' identical in meaning with Biblical ʼĒl ʽElyōn, even though this would be unique.

Frank Moore Cross (1973) accepts all three interpretations as possibilities.

Sanchuniathon
In Eusebius' account of Philo of Byblos (c. 64–141 CE) record of Sanchuniathon's euhemeristic account of the Phoenician deities, Elioun, whom he calls Hypsistos 'the highest' and who is therefore possibly ʿElyōn, is quite separate from his Elus/Cronus who is the supreme god Ēl. Sanchuniathon tells only:
In their time is born a certain Elioun called "the Most High," and a female named Beruth, and these dwelt in the neighbourhood of Byblos.

And from them is born Epigeius or Autochthon, whom they afterwards called Sky; so that from him they named the element above us Sky because of the excellence of its beauty. And he has a sister born of the aforesaid parents, who was called Earth, and from her, he says, because of her beauty, they called the earth by the same name. And their father, the Most High, died in an encounter with wild beasts, and was deified, and his children offered to him libations and sacrifices.
According to Sanchuniathon it is from Sky and Earth that Ēl and various other deities are born, though ancient texts refer to Ēl as creator of heaven and earth. The Hittite theogony knows of a primal god named Alalu who fathered Sky (and possibly Earth) and who was overthrown by his son Sky, who was in turn overthrown by his son Kumarbi. A similar tradition seems to be at the basis of Sanchuniathon's account.

As to Beruth who is here ʿElyōn's wife, a relationship with Hebrew bərīt 'covenant' or with the city of Beirut have both been suggested.

See also
 Al-Ala
 Enlil
 Helios
 Hyperion
 The Hypsistarians, worshippers of the Most High God (Theos Hypsistos), were a distinct non-Jewish monotheistic sect which flourished in Asia Minor and Greece from about 200 BC to about AD 400.
 Illiyin
 Names of God in Judaism

References

Citations

Bibliography
 

 Cross, Frank Moore (1973). Canaanite Myth and Hebrew Epic. Cambridge, Mass.: Harvard University Press.  .
 "The treaty between KTK and Arpad" (1969). Trans. Frans Rosenthal in Ancient Near Eastern Texts, 3rd ed. with Supplement. Princeton: Princeton University Press. .
 The Divine Council: "Deuteronomy 32:8 and the Sons of God", by Michael S. Heiser (PDF.)

Deities in the Hebrew Bible
Hebrew words and phrases
Names of God in Judaism
Superlatives in religion
West Semitic gods
El (deity)